There are a broad range of metrics that denote the relative capabilities of various vehicles. Most of them apply to all vehicles while others are type-specific.

See also

References

External links
Car Performance Meters

Vehicles
Metrics